Gray Township is located in White County, Illinois. As of the 2010 census, its population was 1,141 and it contained 556 housing units.

History
Gray Township was named for James Gray, founder of Grayville.

Geography

Demographics

References

External links
City-data.com
Illinois State Archives

Townships in White County, Illinois
Townships in Illinois
1871 establishments in Illinois